Geoffrey Edwin Cartledge (17 August 1922 – 4 December 2001) was an  Australian rules footballer who played with Hawthorn in the Victorian Football League (VFL).

Personal life 
Cartledge enlisted in the Australian Army on 23 July 1942, one-and-a-half years after the outbreak of the Second World War. He was discharged as a trooper on 12 July 1946.

Notes

External links 

1922 births
2001 deaths
Hawthorn Football Club players
Australian rules footballers from Melbourne
Australian Army personnel of World War II
Australian Army soldiers
People from Malvern, Victoria
Military personnel from Melbourne